Murtin-et-Bogny is a commune in the Ardennes department and Grand Est region of north-eastern France.

Geography
The Sormonne, a left tributary of the Meuse, flows through the commune from west to east.

Population

See also
Communes of the Ardennes department

References

Ardennes communes articles needing translation from French Wikipedia
Communes of Ardennes (department)